Aline Laveen MacMahon (May 3, 1899 – October 12, 1991) was an American actress. Her Broadway stage career began under producer Edgar Selwyn in The Mirage during 1920. She made her screen debut in 1931 and worked extensively in film, theater and television until her retirement in 1975. She was nominated for an Academy Award for Best Supporting Actress for her performance in Dragon Seed (1944).

Early life
MacMahon was born in McKeesport, Pennsylvania, the only child of William Marcus MacMahon and Jennie (née Simon) MacMahon. Her father was a telegraph operator, arbitrage broker and writer / editor in the Munsey publishing company, including their flagship title, Munsey's Magazine.

Aline's parents married on July 14, 1898, in Columbus, Ohio. Her father died on September 6, 1931. Her mother, an avid bell collector, died in 1984, just weeks before her 107th birthday.

MacMahon first appeared on stage as early as 1905. That year the family moved to Brooklyn from McKeesport, and Aline's mother began training her in the art of elocution. Soon, Aline was performing at local churches and festivals where she recited poems and played the violin. By 1908 she was well known enough to attract the attention of the Brooklyn Daily Eagle, who reported "a series of songs and dances by Aline MacMahon" to be performed at St. Jude's Church in Brooklyn. Although she had been earning handsome wages for many years on New York's so-called Strawberry Circuit, MacMahon made her true professional debut with a program of readings, recitations and music at New York's McAlpin Hotel in 1914.

Education
MacMahon was raised first in the Pittsburgh suburb of McKeesport, then in Brooklyn, New York. She attended New York's public school 103, then entered Erasmus Hall High School (Brooklyn) in 1912. In 1916 the MacMahon family moved to the upper west side of Manhattan and Aline enrolled in nearby Barnard College. It was there that MacMahon received a more serious education in acting, enrolling in "Wigs and Cues", the theater program run by the woman who became MacMahon's first great mentor, Minor Latham. By graduation she had appeared in nearly every program the school had mounted during those four years, and found multiple suitors for her talents, including offers from the Provincetown Players, producer / actor Walter Hampden, and the Neighborhood Playhouse.

Career
Aline made her (uncredited) Broadway debut in 1920 as a craps-playing debutante in The Mirage. Her Broadway credits include 24 shows, with many other off-Broadway and regional stage appearances during her career. After traveling to Los Angeles to star in the road company of the Broadway smash Once in a Lifetime, she was noticed by Warner Brothers director Mervyn LeRoy, and made her film debut in the Pre-Code drama Five Star Final (1931). After signing a long term contract with Warners, Aline spent the rest of her career splitting time between New York and Hollywood in order to be with her husband, the Manhattan-based architect and city planner, Clarence Stein. In the1930's and 40's she was a critical darling, often cast as the acerbic comedienne with a heart of gold, or the long-suffering woman who was unlucky in love. She momentarily achieved above-the-title stardom, but her career diminished after a series of health issues endured by her husband. Screen World Presents the Encyclopedia of Hollywood Film Actors states of MacMahon: "She proved to be a fine, sympathetic actress with a quick wit and tart tongue who then moved into character roles with ease as she became plumper and more motherly looking."

The Birth of Method Acting 
In 1922 MacMahon was a member of the Neighborhood Playhouse company in Manhattan, just as Konstantin Stanislavski's Moscow Art Theatre visited New York for a legendary tour. Stanislavski was the originator of what became known as Method acting, popularized much later by Marlon Brando and his successors. Accolades poured in for the MAT's performances, and the executives of the Neighborhood Playhouse made arrangements to charter the first teaching class of the Method in America, which Aline attended with nine others. Aline MacMahon took the tenets of the Method very seriously, and was the only member of that inaugural class to achieve popular success on stage or screen, having debuted the technique on stage in the fall of 1923, and as the first practitioner of it on film in 1931. “I was the first,” she said in 1959, “so to speak, in the first group to be exposed to what has become the Method. Out of that summer [1923] has developed everything that the Method actors are doing." She is the original, pioneering Method actor in the western world.

Personal life
On March 28, 1928, MacMahon and Clarence Stein were married after a long courtship. The pair were devoted to each other, but Stein was sometimes depressed as Aline spent six months a year working in Los Angeles, while he lived and worked in New York City. Stein died in 1975 at the age of 92. The couple had no children, apparently something of a disappointment to her. MacMahon was chairwoman of the Equity Library Theater in 1950. She organized productions for community theaters and was active in relief charities. During the late 1940's and 1950's she was blacklisted as a Communist sympathizer and appeared on the notorious Communist watchlist pamphlet, Red Channels. The FBI began covert investigations of her and Clarence Stein that lasted decades before being quietly dropped in the mid-60's. Throughout their lives the Steins were inveterate travelers, having sailed around the world in 1935-36, including stops in Bali, China and Siam (Thailand), as well as visits across Scandinavia, Europe, South America, Israel and the Middle East.

Death
MacMahon died in 1991, aged 92, of pneumonia in New York City.

Papers
The New York Public Library has a collection of MacMahon's papers that document various aspects of her life. They are housed in the library's Billy Rose Theatre Division. A biography, Aline MacMahon: Hollywood, the Blacklist, and the Birth of Method Acting has been announced for publication on November 8, 2022 by University Press of Kentucky.

Partial filmography

Five Star Final (1931) – Miss Taylor
The Heart of New York (1932) – Bessie, the Neighbor
The Mouthpiece (1932) – Miss Hickey, Day's Secretary
Week-End Marriage (1932) – Agnes Davis
Life Begins (1932) – Miss Bowers
Once in a Lifetime (1932) – May Daniels
One Way Passage (1932) – Betty
Silver Dollar (1932) – Sarah Martin
Gold Diggers of 1933 (1933) – Trixie Lorraine
The Life of Jimmy Dolan (1933) – Mrs. Moore aka Auntie
Heroes for Sale (1933) – Mary
The World Changes (1933) – Anna Nordholm
Heat Lightning (1934) – Olga
The Merry Frinks (1934) – Hattie 'Mom' Frink
Side Streets (1934) – Bertha Krasnoff
Big Hearted Herbert (1934) – Elizabeth
Babbitt (1934) – Myra Babbitt
While the Patient Slept (1935) – Sarah Keate
Mary Jane's Pa (1935) – Ellen Preston
I Live My Life (1935) – Betty Collins
Kind Lady (1935) – Mary Herries
Ah, Wilderness! (1935) – Aunt Lily
When You're in Love (1937) – Marianne Woods
Back Door to Heaven (1939) – Miss Williams
Out of the Fog (1941) – Florence Goodwin
The Lady is Willing (1942) – Buddy
Tish (1942) – Lizzie Wilkins
Stage Door Canteen (1943) – Aline MacMahon
Seeds of Freedom (1943) – Odessa Citizen
Reward Unlimited (1944, short) – Mrs. Scott
Dragon Seed (1944) – Ling Tan's Wife
Guest in the House (1944) – Aunt Martha
The Mighty McGurk (1947) – Mamie Steeple
The Search (1948) – Mrs. Deborah R. Murray
Roseanna McCoy (1949) – Sarie McCoy
The Flame and the Arrow (1950) – Nonna Bartoli
The Eddie Cantor Story (1953) – Grandma Esther
The Man from Laramie (1955) – Kate Canaday
Cimarron (1960) – Mrs. Mavis Pegler
The Young Doctors (1961) – Dr. Lucy Grainger
Diamond Head (1963) – Kapiolani Kahana
I Could Go On Singing (1963) – Ida
All the Way Home (1963) – Aunt Hannah
For the Use of the Hall (1975, TV) - Bess

References

Census and other data
 The 1910 United States Federal Census for Brooklyn, New York, April 16, 1910, Enumeration District 1409, Sheet 5.
 The 1920 United States Federal Census for Manhattan Assembly District 13, January 25, 1920, Enumeration District 943, Sheet 9A.
 U.S. Passport Applications 1795–1925, Roll 1533-6376-6749, March 19–21, 1921 (Ancestry.com)

External links

 
 
 
 
 
 
 
Literature on Aline MacMahon
Aline MacMahon papers, 1899-1989, held by the Billy Rose Theatre Division, New York Public Library for the Performing Arts

1899 births
1991 deaths
20th-century American actresses
Actresses from New York City
American film actresses
American stage actresses
American people of Scotch-Irish descent
American people of Russian-Jewish descent
Barnard College alumni
Erasmus Hall High School alumni
Deaths from pneumonia in New York (state)
People from Brooklyn
People from McKeesport, Pennsylvania
Jewish American actresses
New York (state) Democrats
California Democrats
Pennsylvania Democrats
Method actors